Ovid C. Lewis (August 6, 1932 – January 26, 2011) was an American academic, and was the fourth president of Nova Southeastern University. Lewis graduated from Duke University and Yale University.  He became the President of Nova Southeastern University in 1994 and was president until 1997.

References

External links
Ovid C. Lewis obituary

1932 births
2011 deaths
Case Western Reserve University faculty
Duke University alumni
Duke University School of Law alumni
Presidents of Nova Southeastern University
Yale University alumni